The Andy Weaver Amish, locally also called "Dan Church", "Dan Amish" or "Danners", are a conservative subgroup of Old Order Amish. They are more conservative than average Old Order Amish. 

Andy Weaver Amish are considered a subgroup of the Old Order Amish, although they do not fellowship or intermarry with more liberal Old Order Amish. They speak Pennsylvania German as their mother tongue as well as English with outsiders. 

There is a subgroup of the Swartzentruber Amish, that is also called "Andy Weaver".

History 

In Holmes County, Ohio, the Andy Weaver Amish were formed in 1952 over the issue of shunning. They were named after Andrew J. Weaver, a conservative minister who took a stand against "drift", that is moving towards mainstream society.

Customs and technology 

They are less conservative than the Swartzentruber Amish but more conservative than the Old Order main body. Compared to them they have greater restrictions on farm, business and home technologies, a stricter interpretation of shunning, stricter youth regulations and a greater tolerance of alcohol and tobacco.

Districts and populations 

Most of the Andy Weaver Amish live in Holmes County, Ohio, where they had 30 church districts in 2009. There are three other settlements, including a settlement in Ashland County, Ohio, and in one upstate New York. All together, there were 40 church districts in 2011.

Andy Weaver Amish have the highest rates of retention of their children in the church among all Amish. The retention rate is  estimated at 97%. On the other hand Andy Weavers have left agriculture on a larger scale than other Amish with only 6% active in farming.

Literature 
 Donald B. Kraybill, Karen M. Johnson-Weiner and Steven M. Nolt: The Amish, Johns Hopkins University Press, Baltimore MD 2013. 
 Karen Johnson-Weiner: New York Amish: Life in the Plain Communities of the Empire State, Cornell University Press, Ithaca, NY 2017. 
 Charles Hurst and David McConnell: An Amish Paradox. Diversity and Change in the World's Largest Amish Community,  Johns Hopkins University Press, Baltimore MD 2010

References

External links
 Who are the Andy Weaver Amish? - Amish Online Encyclopedia entry on Andy Weaver Amish technology, history, and customs.

Christian organizations established in 1952
Anabaptist denominations established in the 20th century
Old Order Amish
1952 establishments in Ohio